The 1960–61 season was the fifty-ninth season in which Dundee competed at a Scottish national level, playing in Division One, where the club would finish in 10th place. Dundee would also compete in both the Scottish Cup and the Scottish League Cup. They would be knocked out of both the League Cup and Scottish Cup by Rangers.

Scottish Division One 

Statistics provided by Dee Archive.

League table

Scottish League Cup 

Statistics provided by Dee Archive.

Group 4

Group 4 table

Knockout stage

Scottish Cup 

Statistics provided by Dee Archive.

Player Statistics 
Statistics provided by Dee Archive

|}

See also 

 List of Dundee F.C. seasons

References

External links 

 1960-61 Dundee season on Fitbastats

Dundee F.C. seasons
Dundee